Samuel Edward Bowen (17 November 1903 – 4 March 1981) was an English footballer in the early years of professional football, who played about 200 games for Aston Villa.

References

1903 births
1981 deaths
English footballers
Association football fullbacks
Aston Villa F.C. players